Okoumé was a Quebec based folk-rock band from 1995 to 2002. The group was formed in 1995 and originally consisted only of founding members Jonathan and Éloi Painchaud, Michael Duguay, Hugo Perreault, and Éric Gosselin.

History
The group formed in 1995 received the first prize in French Canadian radio station CKOY-FM's  "Le concours Pro-Scène" ("Pro-Scene Contest"), which yielded them one hundred hours in a recording studio. They were also the opening act for noted French Canadian singer-songwriter Kevin Parent.

Their eponymous first album was released in 1997. Four tracks from the album (Dis-moi pas ça, La lune pleure, Le bruit des origines, and La mer à boire) placed in weekly Top Ten rankings, with Le bruit des origines ranking at number in CKOI-FM's Top 50 of 1998 and La mer à boire ranking at number 24 the following year. The band went on tour to support these releases.

Okoumé released their second album, Plan B, in 2000.  The album failed to capture the interest of the public, so the group decided to disband in 2002.

The band reformed for a reunion show in 2014, as part of Montreal's  Coup de coeur francophone festival.

Members
Michel Duguay - bass
Éric Gosselin  - drums, percussion
Frédéric Lebrasseur - percussion (1995 only)
Éloi Painchaud - backing vocals, guitar, harmonica, flute
Jonathan Painchaud - lead vocals, acoustic guitar
Patrice Painchaud - violin, keyboards (occasional appearances only)
Hugo Perreault - backing vocals, guitars, dulcimer, lap steel guitar, mandolin

Discography

Okoumé (1997) 

1. Le bruit des origines 
2. Dis-moi pas ça
3. À l'enfant que j'aurai
4. La mer à boire
5. La lune pleure
6. Europe
7. Mes idées courent
8. Mr. Bigshot
9. Reste
10. La belle et l'Anglais
11. Assassin
12. Nostradamus

Plan B (2000) 

1. Irresponsable 
2. Descendons tous à la rue
3. Son rire
4. Cheval de fer
5. (www.groupeokoume.com)
6. De la terre à la lune
7. Expert canin
8. Western spaghetti
9. Un homme de mon temps
10. Sans pardon
11. La pluie qui tombe
12. Les magiciens 
13. Rien me tracasse

References

External links
  Quebec Info Musique: 

Musical groups established in 1995
Canadian folk rock groups
Musical groups disestablished in 2002
Musical groups from Montreal